Family History is a Philippine family psychological comedy-drama film written and directed Michael V. in his directoral debut. The film stars Michael V. and Dawn Zulueta.

Cast and characters
Michael V. as Alex Dela Cruz
Dawn Zulueta as May B. Dela Cruz
Miguel Tanfelix as Malix B. Dela Cruz
Bianca Umali as Jenna Roque
John Estrada as Jay Roque
Kakai Bautista as Esmeralda "Dang" Asuncion
Ina Feleo as Anna Roque
Mikoy Morales as Marcus
Jemwell Ventinilla as Pao
Nikki Co as Rico
Vince Gamad as Bogs
Dingdong Dantes as Dr. Ronaldo D. Reyes
Eugene Domingo as Liza De Guzman
Nonie Buencamino as Ding
Mcoy Fundales

Release
The film released on July 24, 2019 in Philippine cinemas. It later on became available on Amazon Prime Video and Netflix.

Reception
The film received positive reviews from critics for Michael V.'s directing and storyline.

References

External links

2019 films
2019 comedy-drama films
2010s psychological drama films
Filipino-language films
GMA Pictures films
Philippine comedy-drama films
Philippine psychological drama films